South Eastern Queensland is an interim Australian bioregion located in south-eastern Queensland and north-eastern New South Wales. It is one of the most biodiverse bioregions in Australia. The bioregion is home to eucalypt forests and woodlands, with rainforests on mountain slopes and in stream valleys and wallum heaths near the coast. South Eastern Queensland bioregion is the northernmost part of the Eastern Australian temperate forests ecoregion.

Geography
South Eastern Queensland bioregion extends along the eastern coast of Australia in south-eastern Queensland and north-eastern New South Wales. It is bounded on the west by the Great Dividing Range, and on the east by the Tasman Sea. It is bounded on the north by the dry coastal region between Gladstone and Rockhampton, where the Brigalow Belt savannas extend to the coast. The Brigalow Belt also bounds the bioregion to the west, beyond the Great Dividing Range.

The bioregion encompasses South East Queensland, the most densely-populated region in Queensland and home to over 70% of the state's population.

Subregions
South Eastern Queensland consists of 14 subregions:

 Burnett-Curtis Hills and Ranges (SEQ01)	– 
 Moreton Basin (SEQ02) – 
 Burringbar-Conondale Ranges (SEQ03) – 
 Sunshine Coast-Gold Coast Lowlands (SEQ04) – 
 Brisbane-Barambah Volcanics (SEQ05) – 
 South Burnett (SEQ06) – 
 Gympie Block (SEQ07) – 
 Burnett-Curtis Coastal Lowlands (SEQ08) – 
 Great Sandy (SEQ09) – 
 Scenic Rim (SEQ10) – 
 Woodenbong (SEQ11) – 
 Clarence Sandstones (SEQ12) – 
 Clarence Lowlands (SEQ13) – 
 Southern Great Barrier Reef (SEQ14) –

Climate
South Eastern Queensland has a humid subtropical climate, with warm rainy summers and mild winters.

Protected areas
The bioregion includes the Gondwana Rainforests and Fraser Island World Heritage Sites. Other protected areas include:

 Arakwal National Park
 Border Ranges National Park
 Broadwater National Park
 Broken Head Nature Reserve
 Bundjalung National Park
 Cape Byron State Conservation Area
 Gibraltar Range National Park
 Iluka Nature Reserve
 Koreelah National Park
 Mebbin National Park
 Moore Park Nature Reserve
 Nightcap National Park
 Richmond Range National Park
 Tooloom National Park
 Toonumbar National Park
 Tweed Heads Historic Site
 Tyagarah Nature Reserve
 Victoria Park Nature Reserve
 Washpool National Park
 Yuraygir National Park

References

Biogeography of Queensland
Biogeography of New South Wales
IBRA regions
Eastern Australian temperate forests